Gillmeria pallidactyla is a moth of the family Pterophoridae first described by the English entomologist, Adrian Hardy Haworth in 1811. It has a Holarctic distribution and is widespread throughout North America and the Palearctic.

Description

The frontal tuft and palpi are very long The posterior tibiae below the middle -spurs are wholly light brown. The ferruginous-ochreous,clouded with yellow-whitish forewings  have a subfalcate apex. The costal edge is dark fuscous; a darker triangular suffusion on costa beyond middle apex forms a darker dot, and this is followed by a whitish costal spot and an ochreous-whitish subterminal line.The apical 2/3 of the terminal cilia is white. The hindwings are dark ochreous-fuscous with a small scale-tooth in the middle.
The larva is green with the dorsal line darker or somewhat brownish-tinged ; subdorsal and lateral grey-whitish. Th subspiracular is 
white and the head whitish -yellowish

Biology
Adults are on wing from June to July in Europe and from June to August in northern North America. They hide amongst low foliage during the day. They become active from dusk onwards.

The larvae bore into the stem in the autumn and overwinter in the roots. In the spring they feed on a succession of shoots causing them to wilt. They mainly feed on Achillea species including sneezewort (Achillea ptarmica) and yarrow (Achillea millefolium), but rarely also on tansy (Tanacetum vulgare) and  Tanacetum corymbosum.

Similar species
This species is superficially similar to Gillmeria ochrodactyla which has brown and white bands on its hindlegs below the middle spurs, whereas the legs of G pallidactyla are not banded.

References

External links
 
 

Platyptiliini
Moths described in 1811
Moths of Asia
Moths of Europe
Moths of North America
Taxa named by Adrian Hardy Haworth